('Lady Sayo of Matsura') or Matsuura Sayohime was a legendary heroine in Japanese mythology, the wife of the historical Ōtomo no Satehiko. She is referred  to as Lady Otohi or Otohihime in an alternate ancient source.

The locale fell within the former , referred to as the "Matsuura region" in modern parlance.

However, the variant legend added that she was afterwards  visited by her husband's look-alike and though she discovered the imposter to be a snake, she had gone missing and was eventually found dead. Her life is ultimately spared in the fairy tale version.

The legend also recalled that she dropped a precious mirror which was a gift from her husband, and later it came to be believed that she had committed suicide by throwing herself into the river while clutching the mirror. This was then dramatized for the noh theatre in the early 15th century.

The motif of Otohihime/Sayohime waving her scarf from the mountaintop has been illustrated in picture books and woodblock prints.

Old legends 
The legends of Matsura Sayohime (aka Otohihime) waving her scarf (hire, a piece of long cloth worn as part of the attire) at the warship carrying her husband are preserved in two ancient pieces of writing, written down some two hundred years after the supposed event took place in the 6th century.

Manyoshu version 
Matsura Sayohime, according to the oldest account related in the poem collection Man'yōshū (8th century), was the  wife of Ōtomo no Satehiko (or Sadehiko). In order to bid farewell to her husband, who was on a ship bound for Korea for a military campaign, she climbed atop a certain mountain peak. So deep was her sorrow: she seemed "gut-wrenchedly" chagrined and darkened-hearted as if her "soul had vanished". Finally, she managed to remove her own scarf and wave it, drawing others around her inevitably to tears.

Date 
Ōtomo no Satehiko was known historically to have been dispatched on two military expeditions to Korea, and the setting of the legend concerns his first trip which occurred in the year 537; though it is the other Fudoki version of the legend described below which supplies the detail which leads to narrowing down this date.

Location 
The , Sayohime's alluded place of origin, spans the current-day Nagasaki and Saga Prefectures.

Fudoki version (as Otohi) 

"Otohi" may indeed be the woman's proper name, however, it may also be a descriptor, with the word otohi having some meaning that is an extension of the oto ("youthful, innocent") element, or possibly meaning "those of younger age". The Lady Otohi is also referred to as otohime ("younger [sister] lady") in the poem inserted in the Fudoki account.

This version recounts that the lady dropped a mirror given by her husband at a ford, or river crossing, and thenceforth the place was named .

This version proceeds to tell the aftermath since the day the woman parts with Satehiko (waving her scarf at the Peak): she received visits from a look-alike of her husband for five nights in a row. Resolving to discover this man's true identity, she tied a "hemp" thread to the hem of his clothing and tracked him, thereby learning his true form: a snake residing at the marsh on the Scarf-Waving Peak. She was subsequently reported missing, and a search led to her skeletonized remains in the marsh.

Suicidal drowning 
 wrote a commentary on waka poetry entitled  (c. 1145) which probably due to a misreading of the Fudoki, states that the lady, grasping the mirror given to her, sunk into the waters of the Kuri River (later called Kagami River, now ).

Petrification version 

According to one version of this legend, she prayed with such fervour that she was transformed into stone. This petrification lore of Sayohime appears to be of later development, with its earliest attestation identified as renga poet 's Sodeshita shū (c. Ōei era, late 14th to early 15th century). Sayohime's petrification is also mentioned in Nihon meijo monogatari (1670).

It states that the lady did not stop at the Scarf-Waving Peak bidding farewell, but she continued to a spot from whose vantage point she beheld an island nearby. She then hopped on a fishing boat to that island, called the  island (present-day Kabe Island) where she climbed a "bit elevated spot" and there, out of sorrow, she turned intorock.

Literary adaptations 
During the early Muromachi Period. The post-medieval narratives of  exists in several variant texts of various forms, e. g., hand-copied manuscripts and illustrated books of the Nara ehon type, sermons, scripts for the jōruri puppet theater, and printed books.

Noh play 
Matsura no Kagami ('The Mirror of Matsura'), also referred to as Matsuura Sayohime [sic.] is also the title of a noh play about the character, whose authorship is ascribed to Zeami. There has survived a holograph copy in Zeami's own hand entitled Matsura no Noh, dated 10th month of 1427/Ōei 24, which closely matches the script text of Matsura no Kagami except for minor differences.

The noh play, adopts the embellished legend where Sayohime drown herself in the sea while clutching the mirror, instead of just losing it. The suicidal drowning had been claimed in literature predating the noh play, such as the aforementioned 12th century Waka dōmōshō and Priest 's .

Monogatari versions 
There are some 7 texts of the fairy tale or monogatari/otogizōshi  version of Sayohime.

The latter title (~ honji, the "original" Buddhist deity) is a reference to the tale purporting to reveal the origins of the principal goddess Benzaiten worshipped at Chikubushima Shrine in Ōmi Province, i.e., on an island in Lake Biwa.

Plot Summary 
But the rich man died penniless, and Sayohime could not afford to sponsor a memorial service for him except by selling herself. Her buyer was a man named  (or "Gonga no Tayū"), who unbeknownst to Sayohime intended to sacrifice her to the snake deity of his village in place of his own daughter. When presented to the snake, Sayohime read from the Lotus sutra, enabling the deity to achieve enlightenment and shed its monstrous form. The deity then returned Sayohime to the care of her mother.

Buddhist perspective 
The Kyoto text has been translated into English by R. Keller Kimbrough in Eight Buddhist Tales (2013).

Self-sacrifice 
The illustrations and text from the Frankfurt emaki manuscript has been analyzed and translated into German by Katja Triplett, with self-sacrifice and human sacrifice being the central themes. The heroine in an act of self-sacrifice  into slavery, into the hands of a human trafficker in order to achieve a deed of filial piety. Needless to say, the common understanding (usual fate) of a miuri woman is that she is selling herself into prostitution, not slavery. But in the Sayohime saga we have divine intervention, and the  deity of Nara disguised as an octagenerian priest intervenes so that Sayohime is discovered and bought by a seeker of a substitute virgin sacrifice (Gonga Tayū), rather than a brothel. Although the story is told as if Gonga  from Michinoku up north is the one obtaining sympathy and help from his clan deity (ujigami) based in Nara, the readers realize that the deity is actually responding to the pleas of the girl Sayohime from Nara.

Puppet plays 

Gesaku 
The petrification legend was adapted by  Takizawa Bakin (d. 1848) into a burlesque novel (gesaku) under the title

Explanatory notes

References 
Citations

Bibliography

 
 
 
 
  alt preview
  (English abstract)
  alt pdf@core.ac.uk
 
 
 
 
 
  Repr. from Minzoku 3 (2), Mar. 1927 
 

Japanese mythology